James Beauttah (1889–1985) was a Kenyan anti-colonial activist and political leader.

Political life 
Beauttah led the Kikuyu Central Association, Kenya's first all-African political organization, together with Joseph Kang'ethe. They were later joined by Jomo Kenyatta in 1924 as they lay the foundation that would be the beginning of his road to the presidency. In either 1925 or early 1926, Beauttah moved to Uganda, although remained in contact with Kenyatta. When the KCA wrote to Beauttah and asked him to travel to London as their representative, he declined, but recommended that Kenyatta—who had a good command of the English language—go in his place. Kenyatta accepted, probably on the condition that the Association matched his pre-existing wage. He thus became the group's secretary.

In 1929, the Kikuyu Central Association decided to send Jomo Kenyatta to Britain to present African grievances before the Colonial office. Indian leader and Legco member, Isher Dass, collected the funds for his trip.

On 24 September 1930 Kenyatta returned to Kenya; he and his wife Grace Wahu reached Mombasa where they were welcomed by Beauttah.

Together with other prominent Kenyans including Peter Mbiu Koinange, James Gichuru, Albert Owino, Joseph Kathithi, Tom Mbotela, Harry Nangurai, Fred Kubai, Jesse Kariuki, Francis Khamasi and Ambrose Ofafa in 1944 they formed Kenya African Study Union (KASU) which later was renamed Kenya African Union (KAU).

James Beauttah was among the first Africans to be arrested by the colonial government together with Rev. Peter Kigondu in 1952. Both of them were given harsh jail sentences and at the expiry of their sentences were detained for 8 years in special detention camps in the most inhospitable parts of the country under emergency regulations.

References

Further reading

External links 

Kenyan politicians
1889 births
1985 deaths